Fiji have competed in all but three Commonwealth Games since 1938, missing only 1990, 1994 and 2010. For the first two of those games they were not members of the Commonwealth following the military coup and declaration of a republic in 1987, and for the third they were suspended. Fiji have won fourteen Commonwealth medals across six sports.

The country was suspended from the Commonwealth, and was banned from taking part in the 2010 Games, but was again represented with a team at the 2014 Commonwealth Games in Glasgow, Scotland.

Medals

See also

All-time medal tally of Commonwealth Games

References

External links
Commonwealth Games Federation
FASANOC

 
Fiji and the Commonwealth of Nations
Nations at the Commonwealth Games